Her Vengeance is a 1988 Hong Kong film directed by Lam Nai-Choi and starring Pauline Wong. It is a remake of  the 1973 rape and revenge film Kiss of Death with elements taken from the 1978 American film I Spit On Your Grave.

Plot
At a Macao nightclub employee Ying (Pauline Wong) inadvertently angers a group of drunken men who follow Wong after her shift has ended and proceed to rape her. After her traumatic ordeal, her blind sister (Elaine Kam) encourages her to seek revenge leading her to ask former-triad Hung (Lam Ching-ying) for help. Hung gives her a job at his lounge as a waiter and helps her find somewhere new to live, but refuses to help her take revenge. A chance encounter with one of her attackers (Shing Fui-On) gives her the opportunity she was waiting for as she begins to hunt them down one by one.

Cast
Pauline Wong Siu-Fung as nightclub employee	Chieh Ying
 Lam Ching-Ying as ex-triad Hung 
 Elaine Kam Yin-Ling as Ying's sister 
 Sit Chi-Lun as Susan, a friend who works at Ying's lounge 
 Kelvin Wong Siu as Ying's would be journalist boyfriend 
 Shing Fui-On as the gang leader  
 Billy Chow Bei-Lei as one of Ying's attackers described as bug-eyed 
 Hon Yee-Sang as one of Ying's attackers 
 Chan Ging as one of Ying's attackers 
 Tse Fook-Yiu as one of Ying's attackers

References

External links
 
 

Remakes of Hong Kong films
Hong Kong thriller films
Rape and revenge films